Tim or Timothy O'Connor may refer to:

Tim O'Connor (actor) (1927–2018), actor, appeared in Peyton Place and General Hospital
Tim O'Connor (theatre director) (born 1981), Australian playwright, theatre director and producer
Tim O'Connor (American football) (born 1967), American college football coach
Tim O'Connor (high jumper), American high jumper and winner at the USA Outdoor Track and Field Championships
Tim O'Connor (skateboarder), skateboarder part of CKY Crew
Tim O'Connor, blues musician whose songs appear in the film Dead Calm, see Billy Zane
Timothy O'Connor (rugby union) (1860–1936), New Zealand rugby player and shot putter
Tim O'Connor, headmaster of Auckland Grammar School, former rector of Palmerston North Boys' High School
Timothy O'Connor (Irish politician) (1906–1986), Irish Fianna Fáil politician
Joe O'Connor (referee) (Timothy Joseph O'Connor, 1892–1961), American boxing referee and Boston fire commissioner
Timothy J. O'Connor Jr. (1936–2018), American politician in the Vermont House of Representatives